Quartu Sant'Elena, located four miles East from Cagliari on the ancient Roman road, is a city and comune in the Metropolitan City of Cagliari, Sardinia, Italy. It is the third biggest city of Sardinia with a population of 71,216 .

History
The city's name comes from its distance to Cagliari (Quartum miles, Latin for “four miles”), and from the passage there of St. Helena, mother of emperor Constantine.

The first traces of human presence in Quartu are from the Prenuragic, Nuragic and Phoenician period, as attested by findings in Cepola, Geremeas, Is Mortorius and Separassiu localities. Roman findings were found near Sant’Andrea villa, a graveyard at S. Martino and a few tombs at Simbirizzi.

In the 11th century AD Sardinia was divided into four Giudicati: Quartu, which included fourteen villas, belonged to the Giudicato of Cagliari.
In 1066 Quartu was given to Cagliari's archbishop and then went back to Judge Torchitorio II of Cagliari. During the Aragonese rule, Quartu suffered from famines, plague, malaria and continuous raids from Saracen pirates, following the general path of decay of the whole of Sardinia.

In 1793 the soldiers of a French fleet landed on the coast of Quartu, with the intention of conquering the whole island; the people of the city, led by Antonio Pisanu, assailed the French and repelled them after a bloody battle.

The feudalism started by the Aragonese, led since 1436 by Giovanni de Sena, viscount of Sanluri and baron of Quatru Saint'Elena, ended in 1836 under the baron Pes di Villamarina. In 1956 Quartu Sant’Elena was upgraded to the status of “city” by the President of Italy Giovanni Gronchi.

Main sights
There are five churches situated in the city. The most important are the churches of Sant'Elena Imperatrice (dating before 1589, but now in neoclassical style and recently proclaimed "Basilica"), Santa Maria Cepola (before 1089) and Sant'Agata.

There is also Sa dom’e farra, a large peasant house of the 17th century with various rooms, objects and tools used by the peasant society.

There are numerous nuraghi in the vicinity.

Geography 
Quartu has a long, shallow coastline. It also looks onto the pond of Molentargius, where flamingos and Sultan roosters nest.

Climate

Economy 
The economy is based on the tertiary industry.
Quartu also produces excellent wines, bread and cakes.
Although the city is not extremely big, there are many shopping opportunities: Carrefour, E. Leclerc-Conad, Iper Pan.

Festivities 

The most important religious festivity is dedicated to Saint Helena and is celebrated on 14 September.

Sport
Quartu Sant'Elena has a 16,500-capacity football stadium, the Stadio Is Arenas. In the 2012–13 season, it hosted Serie A club Cagliari Calcio, whose Stadio Sant'Elia was closed that year.
Quartu Sant'Elena has also a 500-capacity Marina, Marina di Capitana, with a sailing school, Scuola Italia in Vela.

See also
Cagliari metropolitan area

References

External links

 Official website

Cities and towns in Sardinia